Western Finland  was a province of Finland from 1997 to 2009. It bordered the provinces of Oulu, Eastern Finland and Southern Finland. It also bordered the Gulf of Bothnia towards Åland. Tampere was the largest city of the province.

History 

On September 1, 1997 the Province of Turku and Pori, the Province of Vaasa, the Province of Central Finland, the northern parts of the Province of Häme and the western parts of the Mikkeli Province were joined to form the then new Province of Western Finland.

All the provinces of Finland were abolished on January 1, 2010.

Administration 

The State Provincial Office was a joint regional administrative authority of seven ministries. The State Provincial Office served at five localities; the main office was placed in Turku, and regional service offices were located in Jyväskylä, Tampere, Vaasa, and Pori. Approximately 350 persons worked at the State Provincial Office. The agency was divided into eight departments.

Regions 

Western Finland was divided into seven regions:
Southern Ostrobothnia (Etelä-Pohjanmaa / Södra Österbotten)
Ostrobothnia (Pohjanmaa / Österbotten)
Pirkanmaa (Pirkanmaa / Birkaland)
Satakunta (Satakunta / Satakunda)
Central Ostrobothnia (Keski-Pohjanmaa / Mellersta Österbotten)
Central Finland (Keski-Suomi / Mellersta Finland) 
Finland Proper (Varsinais-Suomi / Egentliga Finland)

Municipalities in 2009 (cities in bold) 
Western Finland was divided into 142 municipalities in 2009.

 Akaa
 Alajärvi
 Alavus
 Aura
 Eura
 Eurajoki
 Evijärvi
 Halsua
 Hankasalmi
 Harjavalta
 Himanka
 Honkajoki
 Huittinen
 Hämeenkyrö
 Ikaalinen
 Ilmajoki
 Isojoki
 Isokyrö
 Jakobstad
 Jalasjärvi
 Joutsa
 Juupajoki
 Jyväskylä
 Jämijärvi
 Jämsä
 Kaarina
 Kangasala
 Kankaanpää
 Kannonkoski
 Kannus
 Karijoki
 Karstula
 Karvia
 Kaskinen
 Kauhajoki
 Kauhava
 Kaustinen
 Keuruu
 Kihniö
 Kiikoinen
 Kimitoön
 Kinnula
 Kivijärvi
 Kokemäki
 Kokkola
 Konnevesi
 Korsholm
 Korsnäs
 Koski Tl
 Kristinestad
 Kronoby
 Kuhmalahti
 Kuhmoinen
 Kuortane
 Kurikka
 Kustavi
 Kylmäkoski
 Kyyjärvi
 Köyliö
 Laihia
 Laitila
 Lappajärvi
 Lapua
 Larsmo
 Laukaa
 Lavia
 Lempäälä
 Lestijärvi
 Lieto
 Loimaa
 Luhanka
 Luvia
 Malax
 Marttila
 Masku
 Merikarvia
 Multia
 Muurame
 Mynämäki
 Mänttä-Vilppula
 Naantali
 Nakkila
 Nokia
 Noormarkku
 Nousiainen
 Nykarleby
 Närpes
 Oravais
 Oripää
 Orivesi
 Paimio
 Parkano
 Pedersöre
 Perho
 Petäjävesi
 Pihtipudas
 Pirkkala
 Pomarkku
 Pori
 Punkalaidun
 Pyhäranta
 Pälkäne
 Pöytyä
 Raisio
 Rauma
 Ruovesi
 Rusko
 Saarijärvi
 Salo
 Sastamala
 Sauvo
 Seinäjoki
 Siikainen
 Soini
 Somero
 Säkylä
 Taivassalo
 Tampere
 Tarvasjoki
 Teuva
 Toholampi
 Toivakka
 Turku
 Töysä
 Ulvila
 Urjala
 Uurainen
 Uusikaupunki
 Vaasa
 Valkeakoski
 Vehmaa
 Vesilahti
 Veteli
 Viitasaari
 Vimpeli
 Virrat
 Vähäkyrö
 Väståboland
 Vörå-Maxmo
 Ylöjärvi
 Ähtäri
 Äänekoski

Former municipalities (disestablished before 2009) 

 Alahärmä 
 Alastaro 
 Askainen 
 Dragsfjärd 
 Halikko 
 Houtskär 
 Iniö 
 Jurva 
 Jyväskylän mlk 
 Jämsänkoski 
 Karinainen 
 Kiikala 
 Kimito 
 Kisko 
 Kiukainen 
 Kodisjoki 
 Korpilahti 
 Korpo 
 Kortesjärvi 
 Kullaa 
 Kuorevesi 
 Kuru 
 Kuusjoki 
 Kälviä 
 Lappi 
 Lehtimäki 
 Leivonmäki  
 Lemu 
 Lohtaja 
 Loimaan kunta 
 Luopioinen 
 Längelmäki 
 Maxmo 
 Mellilä 
 Merimasku 
 Mietoinen 
 Mouhijärvi 
 Muurla 
 Mänttä 
 Nagu 
 Nurmo 
 Pargas 
 Perniö 
 Pertteli 
 Peräseinäjoki 
 Piikkiö 
 Pylkönmäki 
 Rymättylä 
 Sahalahti 
 Sumiainen 
 Suodenniemi 
 Suolahti 
 Suomusjärvi 
 Särkisalo 
 Toijala 
 Ullava 
 Vahto 
 Vammala 
 Vampula 
 Velkua 
 Viiala 
 Viljakkala 
 Vilppula 
 Västanfjärd 
 Vörå 
 Ylihärmä 
 Ylistaro 
 Yläne 
 Äetsä

Governors 
Heikki Koski 1997-2003
Rauno Saari 2003-2009

Heraldry 
The coat of arms of Western Finland was composed of the arms of Finland Proper, Satakunta and Ostrobothnia.

Notes

External links 

Western Finland State Provincial Office - Official site

 
Provinces of Finland (1997–2009)
States and territories established in 1997
States and territories disestablished in 2009